Arteriosclerotic heart disease (ASHD), is a thickening and hardening of the walls of the coronary arteries. Atherosclerosis is a potentially serious condition where arteries become clogged with fatty substances called plaques, or atheroma.

See also
 Coronary artery disease

References

Heart diseases